GSC Systems, founded in 1984, is a Canadian manufacturer of wooden propellers for homebuilt and ultralight aircraft. The company headquarters is located in Vernon, British Columbia.

The company was originally part of Aircraft Sales and Parts, but was sold off to an employee in 2000. Originally producing fixed pitch wooden propellers, the company expanded into ground adjustable designs and more recently introducing the GSC-GTA, a mechanical, inflight-adjustable propeller. Their propeller blades are all made from eastern maple hardwood.

Originally called GSC Systems International Ltd., the company is now officially GSC Systems (2004) Ltd.

Applications
Sundog One-Seater
Sundog Two-Seater

See also
List of aircraft propeller manufacturers

References

External links 

Manufacturing companies established in 1984
Aircraft propeller manufacturers
Aerospace companies of Canada
Companies based in Vernon, British Columbia